Anders Johan Ture Rangström (30 November 1884 – 11 May 1947) belonged to a new generation of Swedish composers who, in the first decade of the 20th century, introduced modernism to their compositions. In addition to composing, Rangström was also a musical critic and conductor.

Biography

Rangström was born in Stockholm, where in his late teens he started to write songs. His music teacher suggested that he should "vary the harmonies a bit more, make it a bit wilder!" He followed this advice and soon gained the nickname among his colleagues of "Sturm-und-Drangström". He travelled to Berlin where he studied under Hans Pfitzner for a while in 1905–6, and also studied singing with the Wagnerian Julius Hey, with whom he later went to Munich for further studies.  His compositions at this time were chiefly for voice and piano.

Between 1907 and 1922 he taught singing and from 1922 to 1925 he was principal conductor of the Gothenburg Symphony Orchestra. He founded the Swedish Society of Composers in 1924, and he was employed to promote the works of the Royal Swedish Opera from 1931 to 1936. After this he worked freelance and spent the summers on the island of Törnsholmen which he had been given by the people of Sweden who raised the money to celebrate his fiftieth birthday.

Rangström died at his home in Stockholm after a long illness caused by a throat disease; his funeral was held at Stockholm's Maria Magdalena Church and he is buried in the churchyard at Gryt, Valdemarsvik Municipality, Östergötland County, southeast Sweden.  He was grandfather of a playwright, also named Ture Rangström (born in 1944) the artistic director of Strindbergs Intima Teater (since its re-opening in 2003), and uncle of author Lars Gyllensten.

Works
Many of his early works took the form of symphonic poems, including Dityramb (Dithyramb) (1909), Ett midsommarstycke (A midsummer piece) and En höstsång (An autumn song). Following the success of these poems, Rangström began work on his symphonies, of which there are four. The first, produced in 1914, is dedicated to the memory of Strindberg – August Strindberg in memoriam; the second, from 1919, is entitled Mitt land (My country); the third from 1929, Sång under stjärnorna (Song under the stars), and the fourth from 1936, Invocatio, for orchestra and organ.

He composed three operas, entitled Kronbruden (The Crown Bride), based on a play by Strindberg, which was first performed in 1915, Medeltida (Medieval), published in 1921, and Gilgamesj, based on the Mesopotamian Epic of Gilgamesh, written during the last years of his life. The orchestration of Gilgamesj was completed by the composer John Fernström, and it was premièred in November 1952 at the Royal Swedish Opera with Erik Saedén in the title role and Herbert Sandberg conducting. Rangström also wrote almost 300 songs and orchestrated about 60 of them.

Orchestral 
 Dithyramb, symphonic poem, 1909 (revised by Kurt Atterberg, 1948)
 Ett midsommarstycke, symphonic poem, 1910
 En höstsång, symphonic poem, 1911
 Havet sjunger, symphonic poem, 1913
 Symphony no. 1 in C-sharp minor, August Strindberg in memoriam, 1914
 Intermezzo drammatico, suite, 1916–18
 Divertimento elegiaco, suite for string orchestra, 1918
 Två melodier, clarinet and strings, 1919
 Symphony no. 2 in D minor, Mitt land, 1919
 Två svenska folkmelodier, 1928
 Symphony no. 3 in D flat Sång under stjärnorna, 1929
 Partita for violin and orchestra in B minor, 1933
 Symphony no. 4 in D minor Invocatio, 1935
 Ballade for piano and orchestra, 1937
 Vauxhall, suite 1937
 Staden spelar, divertissement, 1940

Chamber music 
 String quartet in G minor, Ein Nachtstück in ETA Hoffmanns Manier, 1909 (rev. Edvin Kallstenius and Kurt Atterberg 1948)
 Suite in modo antico, violin and piano, 1912
 Suite in modo barocco, violin and piano, 1920–22

Piano 
 Fyra preludier, 1910–13
 Mälarlegender, 1919
 Sommarskyar, 1916–20
 Improvisata, 1927
 Sonatin, 1937
 Spelmansvår, suite, 1943

References

External links

1884 births
1947 deaths
20th-century Swedish male musicians
20th-century Swedish musicians
Male opera composers
Modernist composers
Musicians from Stockholm
Swedish classical composers
Swedish male classical composers
Swedish opera composers